Class of 2020 is a 2020 Hindi web series created and produced by Vikas Gupta for Ekta Kapoor's video on demand platform ALTBalaji. It stars Rohan Mehra and Joyita Chatterjee in lead roles. The web series revolves around the lives of a few teenagers who get intertwined with drugs, sex, peer pressure and anxiety. On 25 January 2020, the trailer of this series was released. The series started streaming on ALTBalaji from 4 February 2020.

Cast
 Rohan Mehra as Ibrahim Noorani
 Joyita Chatterjee as Ranchi Das Gupta
 Sushant Tanwar as Hardik Thakkar
 Chetna Pande as Priyanka Ahluwalia
 Ishaa Chawla as Aalia
 Nibedita Pal as Zoey D'Souza
 Abhishek Ranjan as Lucky Singh 
 Mazhar Khan as Ronit Banerjee 
 Prakruti Mishra as Ketki
 Pallabi Mukherjee as Palak Dasgupta
 Jatin Suri as Neelrana Banerjee
 Alam Khan as Tanmay Banik (Toto)
 Nausheen Ali Sardar as Hina
 Rushad Rana as Ronit & Neel's dad
 Sagar Saikia as Hina's friend

Episodes

 Episode 1: De Nobili High Returns
 Episode 2: No One Will Believe You
 Episode 3: Welcome To Class Of 2020
 Episode 4: Not Everything Is As It Seems
 Episode 5: Happy Birthday Toto
 Episode 6: Forty-Five Minutes
 Episode 7: Of Mothers and Daughters
 Episode 8: How Was Your Date?
 Episode 9: Parents Of 2020
 Episode 10: I Will Be Your Driver
 Episode 11: Beginning Of The End
 Episode 12: Repercussions of Ignorance
 Episode 13: Sports Day 2018 vs 2020
 Episode 14: Relations 2018 vs 2020
 Episode 15: Night that changed everything
 Episode 16: Men don't cry 
 Episode 17: Ibrahim ki Duniya
 Episode 18: Dosti ya Pyaar
 Episode 19: Pyjama Party 
 Episode 20: Truth Brings Dare
 Episode 21: Beginning of another end
 Episode 22: I need to talk to you
 Episode 23: Helplessness
 Episode 24: Not All Men Are Jerks
 Episode 25: Love, Sex AUR Dhoka
 Episode 26: The party. The plan and The panic 
 Episode 27: The perfect end, is it
 Episode 28: The morning after
 Episode 29: I am your mother
 Episode 30: Last day at de nobli high
 Episode 31: Season Finale Part 1
 Episode 32: Season Finale Part 2

References

External links
 Class of 2020 on ALTBalaji website
 

Hindi-language web series
ALTBalaji original programming
Indian drama web series
2020 web series debuts
Teen drama web series